Bermuda competed in the Winter Olympic Games for the first time at the 1992 Winter Olympics in Albertville, France, represented by a single athlete. Simon Payne became the first person to represent Bermuda at the Winter Olympics, and later founded the Bermuda Luge Federation.

Competitors
The following is the list of number of competitors in the Games.

Luge

Men

References

External links
Official Olympic Reports
 Olympic Winter Games 1992, full results by sports-reference.com

Nations at the 1992 Winter Olympics
1992 Winter Olympics
1992 in Bermudian sport